"Birches" is a poem by American poet Robert Frost. First published in the August, 1915 issue of The Atlantic Monthly together with "The Road Not Taken" and "The Sound of Trees" as "A Group of Poems". It was included in Frost's third collection of poetry Mountain Interval, which was published in 1916. Consisting of 59 lines, it is one of Robert Frost's most anthologized poems. Along with other poems that deal with rural landscape and wildlife, it shows Frost as a nature poet.

Text
Birches

Summary
When the speaker (the poet himself) sees a row of bent birches in contrast to straight trees, he likes to think that some boy has been swinging them. He then realizes that it was not a boy, rather an ice storm that had bent the birches. On a winter morning, freezing rain covers the branches with ice, which then cracks and falls to the snow-covered ground. The sunlight refracts on the ice crystals, making a brilliant display.

When the truth strikes the speaker, he still prefers his imagination of a boy swinging and bending the birches. The speaker says he also was a swinger of birches when he was a boy and wishes to be so now. When he becomes weary of this world, and life becomes confused, he would like to go toward heaven by climbing a birch tree and then coming back again, because earth is the right place for love.

Analysis
This poem is written in blank verse, with a particular emphasis on the "sound of sense". For example, when Frost describes the cracking of the ice on the branches, his selections of syllables create a visceral sense of the action taking place: "Soon the sun's warmth makes them shed crystal shells / Shattering and avalanching on the snow crust — / Such heaps of broken glass to sweep away..."

Originally, this poem was called "Swinging Birches", a title that perhaps provides a more accurate depiction of the subject. In writing this poem, Frost was inspired by his childhood experience with swinging on birches, which was a popular game for children in rural areas of New England during the time. Frost's own children were avid "birch swingers", as demonstrated by a selection from his daughter Lesley's journal: "On the way home, i climbed up a high birch and came down with it and I stopped in the air about three feet and pap cout me."

In the poem, the act of swinging on birches is presented as a way to escape the hard rationality or "Truth" of the adult world, if only for a moment. As the boy climbs up the tree, he is climbing toward "heaven" and a place where his imagination can be free. The narrator explains that climbing a birch is an opportunity to "get away from earth awhile / And then come back to it and begin over." A swinger is still grounded in the earth through the roots of the tree as he climbs, but he is able to reach beyond his normal life on the earth and reach for a higher plane of existence.

Frost highlights the narrator's regret that he can no longer find this peace of mind from swinging on birches. Because he is an adult, he is unable to leave his responsibilities behind and climb toward heaven until he can start fresh on the earth. In fact, the narrator is not even able to enjoy the imagined view of a boy swinging in the birches. In the fourth line of the poem, he is forced to acknowledge the "Truth" of the birches: the bends are caused by winter storms, not by a boy swinging on them.

Significantly, the narrator's desire to escape from the rational world is inconclusive. He wants to escape as a boy climbing toward heaven, but he also wants to return to the earth: both "going and coming back". The freedom of imagination is appealing and wondrous, but the narrator still cannot avoid returning to "Truth" and his responsibilities on the ground; the escape is only a temporary one.
The poem is full of ambiguity and it has got a very aesthetic sense to it.

Overview
Written in conversational language, the poem constantly moves between imagination and fact, from reverie to reflection. In the opening, the speaker employs an explanation for how the birch trees were bent. He is pleased to think that some boys were swinging them when he is suddenly reminded that it is actually the ice-storm that bends the trees. Thus, the poem makes some shift of thought in its description. An abrupt shift occurs when the speaker yearns to leave this earth because of its confusion and make a heaven-ward journey. But the speaker does not want to die by leaving earth forever. He wants to come back to this earth, because to the speaker, the earth is, though not perfect, a better place for going on. The speaker is not one who is ready to wait for the promise of afterlife. The love expressed here is for life and himself. This shows Frost's agnostic side where heaven is a fragile concept to him. This becomes clear when he says, "the inner dome of heaven had fallen."

Rich metaphoric thinking and imagery abound in the poem, where Frost presents some sharp descriptions of natural phenomena.

Form
The poem is written in blank verse. The language is conversational (use of first person "I" and second person "You".)

References

External links
 "Birches" at Academy of American Poets
 "Birches" at Poetry Foundation
 "Birches" at LibriVox (12 free readings, downloadable)

Robert Frost
1915 poems
1900s poems
Poetry by Robert Frost
American poems